Bernard Gardon (born 2 December 1951) is a retired football defender from France, who obtained one cap for the France national team.

Titles
French championship in 1973, 1978, 1981
Coupe de France in 1980 with AS Monaco FC

References
  French Football Federation Profile
  Career

1951 births
Living people
Sportspeople from Clermont-Ferrand
French footballers
France international footballers
Association football defenders
FC Nantes players
Lille OSC players
AS Monaco FC players
AS Saint-Étienne players
Ligue 1 players
Footballers from Auvergne-Rhône-Alpes